Iulian Petrache (born 14 March 1991, in Comănești) is a Romanian footballer who plays for Morpeth Town F.C.

References

External links
MLSZ 

1991 births
Living people
People from Comănești
Romanian footballers
Association football defenders
Liga II players
CF Liberty Oradea players
FC UTA Arad players
FC Bihor Oradea players
FC Zalău players
Kaposvári Rákóczi FC players
Nemzeti Bajnokság I players
Romanian expatriate footballers
Expatriate footballers in Hungary
Expatriate footballers in Poland
Romanian expatriate sportspeople in Hungary
CS Petrocub Hîncești players